The Ministry of Home Affairs is the home affairs ministry of the government of Zimbabwe. It governs several matters, including the following:

 Zimbabwe Republic Police
 Registrar General, 
 Immigration
 National Archives of Zimbabwe, 
 National Museums and Monuments of Zimbabwe, 
 Board of Censors, 
 Lotteries and Gaming Board

It was a "sticking point" issue in the political negotiations between the three largest parties in the Parliament, which finally resolved to place two co-ministers from the two largest parliamentary parties over the ministry.

External links
 Ministry of Home Affairs

References

Government of Zimbabwe
Zimbabwe